The double cylinder, Nos. 8 and No. 9 hand grenades, also known as the "jam tins", are a type of improvised explosive device used by the British and Commonwealth forces, notably the Australian and New Zealand Army Corps (ANZAC) in World War I. The jam tin, or bully beef tin, was one of many grenades designed by ANZACs in the early part of the First World War in response to a lack of equipment suited to trench warfare.

The grenade was an inner can of explosive with an outer can of metal fragments or ball bearings. The heavier pattern No. 9 grenade contained more high explosive and more metal fragments.

The fuse was ignited by a friction device or a cigarette.

Initially when demand for grenades was at its greatest, engineers were encouraged to improvise their own grenades from the tins containing the soldier's ration of jam, hence the name. Incidents with the improvised form and the supply of superior grenades led to official withdrawal of the design.

Jam tin grenades were used as booby traps by ANZACs, by rigging it to a pressure trigger and leaving it under a body or other heavy object to keep it unarmed until it was disturbed.

During the Siege of Kut in Mesopotamia (Dec.1915– Apr.1916),  the Royal Engineers in General Townshend's force improvised jam pot mortar shells to be used with equally creative mortars devised from the cylinders of a Gnome  rotary engine (credit to Capt. R.E. Stace, RE). (The engine came from a Martinsyde S1 scout plane, likely damaged or otherwise unable to evacuate.)

References

External links
Weapons of War: Grenades
British Hand Grenades On The Western Front In The Great War

Fragmentation grenades
World War I grenades of the United Kingdom
Hand grenades of the United Kingdom
World War I infantry weapons of Australia

Improvised explosive devices
Improvised weapons